Stanisław Skwira (born 16 August 1951) is a Polish modern pentathlete. He competed at the 1972 Summer Olympics.

References

1951 births
Living people
Polish male modern pentathletes
Olympic modern pentathletes of Poland
Modern pentathletes at the 1972 Summer Olympics
People from Lipsko County
Sportspeople from Masovian Voivodeship